The Chropi GP10 was a submachine gun built by Chropi, Hropi a Greek chemicals company, which used the "Chropi" spelling on its weapons. It was designed by a team under Sotiris Sofianopoulos (apparently an original Greek-Cypriot design) and was proposed to the Greek Army in 1975. Initial positive performance results during tests were followed by a final rejection with dire consequences for the company, which had improved its existing infrastructure in order to mass-produce the weapon. About 100 units had been produced, which were delivered to the Greek state and ended up in Greek Army storage facilities.

Bibliography

 

.45 ACP submachine guns
9mm Parabellum submachine guns
Firearms of Greece